Géza von Radványi (born Géza Grosschmid; 26 September 1907 – 27 November 1986) was a Hungarian film director, cinematographer, producer and writer.

Biography 
Born Géza Grosschmid, he took the name Radványi from his paternal grandmother. His brother was the writer Sándor Márai. Géza von Radványi made his debut in journalism before moving to cinema in 1941. He aimed to create a popular cinema in the 1950s and 1960s that would rival Hollywood studios, due to European coproductions.

He began at the end of the 1940s, with Somewhere in Europe and Women Without Names, neorealist dramas with no concession to the ravages of war and the postwar period. During the 1950s, Radványi changed his style: L'Étrange Désir de monsieur Bard, with Michel Simon and Geneviève Page (1953), and, above all, the success of his remake of Mädchen in Uniform with Lilli Palmer and the young rising star Romy Schneider (1958). He also made in the same decade , a thriller based on a script by Boileau and Narcejac, with Lino Ventura and Laurent Terzieff, as well as a slapstick comedy, An Angel on Wheels with Romy Schneider and Henri Vidal (1959).

During the 1960s, he became both more ambitious and more bankable, making 70 mm coproductions like Uncle Tom's Cabin with Mylène Demongeot and Herbert Lom (1965), and Der Kongreß amüsiert sich with Lilli Palmer, Curd Jürgens, Paul Meurisse and Françoise Arnoul (1966), both of which were rather unsuccessful.

In contrast, he surprisingly wrote the script for the successful film produced by Louis de Funès, L'homme orchestre, directed by Serge Korber (1970). His 1961 film Das Riesenrad was entered into the 2nd Moscow International Film Festival. His 1965 film Uncle Tom's Cabin was entered into the 4th Moscow International Film Festival.

Géza von Radványi ended his career with a modest production made in his home country, Circus Maximus (1980).

Selected filmography 
 1940: Sarajevo 
 1942: Yellow Hell 
 1947: Valahol Európában, with Artúr Somlay and Miklós Gábor
 1950: Women Without Names, with Simone Simon and Françoise Rosay
 1953: L'Étrange Désir de monsieur Bard, with Michel Simon and Geneviève Page
 1955: A Girl Without Boundaries, with Sonja Ziemann and Ivan Desny
 1955: Ingrid – Die Geschichte eines Fotomodells, with Johanna Matz and Paul Hubschmid
 1957: , with Karlheinz Böhm
 1958: Der Arzt von Stalingrad, with O. E. Hasse, Eva Bartok, Hannes Messemer and Mario Adorf
 1958: Mädchen in Uniform, with Romy Schneider and Lilli Palmer
 1959: , with Lino Ventura, Laurent Terzieff, Hannes Messemer, Eva Bartok and Gert Fröbe
 1959: An Angel on Wheels, with Romy Schneider and Henri Vidal
 1960: , with Wolfgang Lukschy and Hans Christian Blech
 1961: , with Elke Sommer and Karin Baal
 1961: Das Riesenrad, with Maria Schell and O. W. Fischer
 1961: , with O. W. Fischer, Jean Richard, Eva Bartok and Senta Berger
 1961: , with O. W. Fischer, Jean Richard, Eva Bartok and Senta Berger
 1965: Uncle Tom's Cabin, with John Kitzmiller, Mylène Demongeot, Juliette Gréco, Herbert Lom and O. W. Fischer
 1966: , with Curd Jürgens, Lilli Palmer, Hannes Messemer, Paul Meurisse and Françoise Arnoul
 1980: Circus Maximus, with Ági Margittay and Antal Páger

Bibliography 
He published many crime novels under the pseudonym Géza Radvany :
 16 Heures au Paradis, novel, Éditions de Trévise, Paris, 1974.
 Troubles, novel, Éditions de Trévise, Paris, 1975. 
 Les Otages de la nuit, novel, Éditions de Trévise, Paris, 1976. 
 Chantage sur canapé, novel, Éditions de Trévise, Paris, 1978. 
 Drames de dames, novel, Éditions de Trévise, Paris, 1980.

Notes
 René Barjavel: .

References

 Article on Somewhere in Europe

External links 
 

1907 births
1986 deaths
German-language film directors
Hungarian film directors
Hungarian cinematographers
Hungarian film producers
Hungarian-German people
Writers from Košice